Alessia Scortechini (born 11 February 1997) is an Italian Paralympic swimmer who competes in international level events. She is a double World champion and a double European bronze medalist. She competed at the 2020 Summer Paralympics, in Women's 50m Freestyle-S10.

Biography
She is born with a shortened forearm and has limited strength in her wrist. She competed at the 2017 World Para Swimming Championships, and 2019 World Para Swimming Championships.

See also
Italy at the 2020 Summer Paralympics

References

External links
 

1997 births
Living people
Swimmers from Rome
Paralympic swimmers of Italy
Medalists at the World Para Swimming Championships
Medalists at the World Para Swimming European Championships
Paralympic gold medalists for Italy
Swimmers at the 2020 Summer Paralympics
S10-classified Paralympic swimmers
Italian female freestyle swimmers
Italian female butterfly swimmers
Mediterranean Games silver medalists for Italy
Mediterranean Games medalists in swimming
Swimmers at the 2018 Mediterranean Games